Coleophora onopordiella is a moth of the family Coleophoridae. It is found in France and Italy, and from Poland to Greece.

The larvae feed on Arctium, Berteroa, Bromus, Erysimum, Marrubium vulgare, Onopordum, Salvia, Secale, Stachys officinalis and Xeranthemum species. They create a laterally compressed, bivalved, composite leaf case. The case is made out of about 15 leaf fragments, that extend saw-like dorsally and ventrally. The mouth angle is about 30°.

References

onopordiella
Moths described in 1849
Moths of Europe